The Multnomah Community Ability Scale is a standardized mental health assessment which scores several different axes of functionality independently.  The test was originally developed in Multnomah County, Oregon, whose name it still bears.  The MCAS is a common tool in assessing progress on treatment goals, as it is more in-depth than the more simplified  GAF scale.

External links
Detailed explanation and instruction for the MCAS

Multnomah County, Oregon